Gardel is a settlement in Guadeloupe in the commune of Le Moule, on the island of Grande-Terre.  Boisvin is to its west, and Zevallos is to its east; to the north are Guillocheau, Laureal, Portland and Guenette.

Populated places in Guadeloupe